Neohebestola concolor is a species of beetle in the family Cerambycidae. It was described by Johan Christian Fabricius in 1798.

References

Forsteriini
Beetles described in 1798